The qualifying competition for the 2020 CONCACAF Women's Olympic Qualifying Championship determined five of the eight teams of 2020 CONCACAF Women's Olympic Qualifying Championship final tournament.

Teams
A total of 25 CONCACAF teams (out of 41) entered Olympic qualifying, with 22 involved in regional qualifiers for the final tournament. The entrants are divided into three zones:
North American Zone (NAFU): All 3 teams, Canada, Mexico, and United States, qualified automatically for the final tournament.
Central American Zone (UNCAF): 6 out of 7 teams entered, with two teams qualifying for the final tournament.
Caribbean Zone (CFU): 16 out of 31 teams entered, with three teams qualifying for the final tournament.

Notes
Teams in bold qualified for the final tournament.
(N): Not a member of the International Olympic Committee, ineligible for Olympics
(Q): Qualified automatically for final tournament
(W): Withdrew after draw

Draw
The draw for the Caribbean qualifying round took place on 29 July 2019, 11:00 EDT (UTC−4), at the CONCACAF Headquarters in Miami. The 16 teams which entered the Caribbean qualifying round were drawn into three groups, one of six teams and two of five teams. Based on the FIFA World Ranking (as of 29 March 2019), the 16 teams were distributed into five pots, as follows:

The draw for the Central American qualifying round took place on 30 July 2019, 11:00 EDT (UTC−4), at the CONCACAF Headquarters in Miami. The six teams which entered the Central American qualifying round were drawn into two groups of three teams. Based on the FIFA World Ranking (as of 29 March 2019), the six teams were distributed into three pots, with top seeds assigned to each group prior to the draw, as follows:

Central America
Matches were played between 4–8 October 2019. Group winners qualified for 2020 CONCACAF Women's Olympic Qualifying Championship.

Group A
All matches will be held in Costa Rica. Times are local, UTC–6.

Group B
All matches were held in Panama. Times are local, UTC–5.

Caribbean
The Group A and B matches were played between 30 September – 8 October, and the Group C matches were played between 3–7 October 2019. Group winners qualified for 2020 CONCACAF Women's Olympic Qualifying Championship.

Group A
All matches were held in Trinidad and Tobago. Times are local, UTC−4.

Group B
All matches were held in Jamaica. Times are local, UTC−5.

Group C
All matches were held in Puerto Rico. Times are local, UTC−4.

Qualified teams
The following eight teams qualified for the final tournament.

1 Bold indicates champions for that year. Italic indicates hosts for that year.

References

External links
Concacaf Women's Olympic Qualifying, CONCACAF.com

Qualification
Olympic Qualifying Championship, Women's qualification
2019 in women's association football
September 2019 sports events in North America
October 2019 sports events in North America